The 2022–23 Quinnipiac Bobcats Men's ice hockey season is the 47th season of play for the program. They represent Quinnipiac University in the 2022–23 NCAA Division I men's ice hockey season and for the 18th season in the ECAC Hockey conference. The Bobcats are coached by Rand Pecknold, in his 28th season, and play their home games at the M&T Bank Arena.

Season

Departures

Recruiting

Roster
As of August 27, 2022.

Standings

Schedule and results

|-
!colspan=12 style=";" | Exhibition

|-
!colspan=12 ! style=""; | Regular Season

|-
!colspan=12 style=";" | 

|-
!colspan=12 ! style=""; | Regular Season

|-
!colspan=12 ! style=""; | 

|-
!colspan=12 ! style=""; | Regular Season

|-
!colspan=12 style=";" | 

|-
!colspan=12 style=";" |

Scoring statistics

Goaltending statistics

Rankings

*USCHO did not release a week 12 poll.

References

2022-23
Quinnipiac Bobcats
Quinnipiac Bobcats
Quinnipiac Bobcats
Quinnipiac Bobcats